Keram Kandi (also Romanized as Keram Kandī) is a village in Qeshlaq-e Jonubi Rural District, Qeshlaq Dasht District, Bileh Savar County, Ardabil Province, Iran. At the 2006 census, its population was 78, in 14 families.

References 

Towns and villages in Bileh Savar County